The Bornean bristlehead (Pityriasis gymnocephala), also variously known as the bristled shrike, bald-headed crow or the bald-headed wood-shrike, is the only member of the passerine family Pityriasidae and genus Pityriasis.  It is an enigmatic and uncommon species of the rainforest canopy of the island of Borneo, to which it is endemic.

Taxonomy 
The relationships of this species have been controversial.  At times it has been placed in the Prionopidae, the Cracticidae, the Artamidae or the Corvidae. A more recent suggestion has been to include it in the Tephrodornithidae, a new family that includes Hemipus and Tephrodornis.

Description 
 
The bristlehead is a medium-sized ( in length) black or dark grey bird, with red thighs and a red head, throat and neck, with grey ear-coverts and a featherless yellow crown. There is a white wing-patch, visible in flight, and females also have red spots on the flanks. It has a massive heavy black hooked bill and a short tail, giving it a chunky appearance. The crown is covered by short (3–4 mm) yellow or straw-coloured skin projections like bare feather shafts, hence the name 'bristlehead'.  Juveniles have black thighs, red ear-coverts, a red eye-ring, just a few red feathers on the head and undeveloped 'bristles'.

It is a noisy species making a variety of unmusical calls, including distinctive high-pitched nasal whining notes interspersed with harsher notes, chattering noises, whistles, honks and chortles.

Distribution and habitat 
The bristlehead is endemic to the island of Borneo, throughout the lowlands of which it has been recorded up to 1200 m asl, though its distribution is sparse, patchy and unpredictable.  It may be found in both primary and secondary lowland forests, including peat swamp forests, mixed dipterocarp forests and mangroves.

Behaviour 
The bristlehead is a sociable species which often moves steadily in small garrulous flocks of 6–10 birds in the mid and upper canopy of the forest, sometimes accompanied by other large forest birds such as malkohas, babblers, drongos, trogons, woodpeckers and hornbills in mixed-species feeding flocks. Its movements in the canopy are slow and heavy and it flies with a fast, shallow wing-beat.

Feeding 
Bornean bristleheads are primary consumers. They feed on small plants, fruits and vegetable.

Breeding 
Breeding behaviour is largely unknown, though an oviduct egg was described as being white with grey and brown spots and with dimensions of 31 x 25 mm.  A sighting of two apparent females feeding a fledgling has been interpreted as suggesting communal breeding.  Birds have also been seen in flight carrying nesting material.

Conservation 
The main threat to the bristlehead comes from habitat destruction through logging of lowland primary forest and burning of peat swamp forest, and the species has almost certainly undergone a population decline.  However, it also occurs in less affected forests on slopes so is classified as vulnerable.

References

External links 
BirdLife Species Factsheet
Image at ADW 

Pityriaseidae
Endemic birds of Borneo
Birds described in 1835